Konnichiwa (Japanese: こんにちは。) is a 2008 album by Youmou & Ohana. The first track, "Falling", features the music of Corinne Bailey Rae.

Track list
1. Falling 
2. Kaze ni fukarete (風に吹かれて)
3. Rararurararurara (ララルララルララ)
4. Yureru (揺れる)
5. Tenohira (手のひら)
6. Namioto (波音)
7. Wa (輪)
8. O mamori no uta (おまもりのうた)

References

2008 albums
Youmou & Ohana albums